This article describes the present Diocese of Monterey in California.  The entity previously known as the Diocese of Monterey from 1849 until 1859, and subsequently known as the Diocese of Monterey-Los Angeles from 1859 until 1922, is the present Archdiocese of Los Angeles.  The entity known as the Diocese of Monterey-Fresno from 1922 until 1967 was canonically suppressed with the simultaneous erection of the present Diocese of Monterey in California and the present Diocese of Fresno.

The Roman Catholic Diocese of Monterey in California is an ecclesiastical territory or diocese in the United States of the Latin Church of the Roman Catholic Church in the Central Coast region of California. It comprises Monterey, San Benito, San Luis Obispo, and Santa Cruz counties.

The diocese is led by an ordinary bishop; the bishop's cathedra is located at the Cathedral of San Carlos Borromeo, the mother church of the diocese, in Monterey, California. The diocese serves close to 200,000 Catholics in 46 parishes and 18 schools.

History
The history of the Catholic Church in Monterey began with the establishment on the shores of Monterey Bay of Mission San Carlos Borromeo in 1770 by Saint Junípero Serra, OFM. Father Serra moved the mission to Carmel the next year, which served as the headquarters of the chain of Spanish missions in California.

With the papal bull Apostolicam sollicitudinem of 27 April 1840, Pope Gregory XVI set up a new episcopal see, to which he gave the name of Diocese of California. He assigned to it a vast territory taken from that of the Diocese of Sonora, now the Archdiocese of Hermosillo in Mexico. It included Alta California (corresponding to the present states of California, Nevada, Arizona, Utah, western Colorado and southwestern Wyoming) and the Baja California Territory (the modern Mexican states of Baja California and Baja California Sur). He set the episcopal see at San Diego and made the diocese a suffragan of the Archdiocese of Mexico City.  The first bishop of the diocese was Francisco Garcia Diego y Moreno, OFM. Mission Santa Barbara served as the pro-cathedral.

After ceding Alta California to the United States at the close of the Mexican–American War, the government of Mexico objected to a see located in the United States having jurisdiction over parishes in Mexican Baja California. The Holy See divided the diocese into American and Mexican sections on 20 November 1849.  With the see moved to Monterey, a more central position for the new diocese, the American section became the Diocese of Monterey. The Royal Presidio Chapel in Monterey served as the cathedral of the American diocese. In 1853, Pope Pius IX split the diocese again, erecting the Metropolitan Archdiocese of San Francisco and designating the Diocese of Monterey as the suffragan of the new archdiocese.

In 1859, Pope Pius IX changed the name of the diocese to the Diocese of Monterey-Los Angeles due to the growth of the City of Los Angeles.  On June 1, 1922, Pope Pius XI renamed that diocese again, to the Diocese of Los Angeles-San Diego, and simultaneously erected a new diocese, the Diocese of Monterey-Fresno with the northern part of its former territory.

In 1936, Pope Pius XI simultaneously elevated and changed the title of the Diocese of Los Angeles-San Diego to Archdiocese of Los Angeles,<ref>Ibid., p. 378.</ref> erected the Diocese of San Diego with territory taken from that jurisdiction, and elevated that jurisdiction a metropolitan archdiocese with the newly formed Diocese of San Diego and the Diocese of Monterey-Fresno as its suffragan sees, transferring the latter from the metropolitan province of San Francisco.

Finally, in 1967, Pope Paul VI divided the Diocese of Monterey-Fresno and erected the present Diocese of Fresno and the present Diocese of Monterey in California in the territory of the old diocese, making both the new dioceses also suffragans of the Metropolitan Archdiocese of Los Angeles.  The present'' Diocese of Monterey in California is the diocese canonically erected under this title in 1967.

Bishops
The lists of Bishops and their years of service:

Bishops of Monterey in California
 Harry Anselm Clinch (1967–1982)
 Thaddeus Anthony Shubsda (1982–1991)
 Sylvester Donovan Ryan (1992–2006)
 Richard John Garcia (2007–2018)  - Gerald Eugene Wilkerson, Auxiliary Bishop of Los Angeles (apostolic administrator 2018–2019)
 Daniel E. Garcia (2019–present)

Other priests of this diocese who became Bishops
 Tod David Brown, appointed Bishop of Boise City in 1988

Churches

The churches in the Diocese of Monterey include the Cathedral of San Carlos in Monterey (the oldest stone building and the first cathedral in California) and seven former Spanish Missions: Carmel Mission Basillica; Mission Nuestra Señora de la Soledad; Mission San Antonio de Padua; Mission San Juan Bautista; Mission San Luis Obispo de Tolosa; Mission San Miguel Arcangel; and Mission Santa Cruz. A complete list of the churches in the diocese is found at List of churches in the Roman Catholic Diocese of Monterey.

High schools
 Mission College Preparatory High School, San Luis Obispo
 Notre Dame High School, Salinas
 Palma High School, Salinas
 Saint Francis Central Coast Catholic High School, Watsonville
 Santa Catalina School, Monterey

See also

 Catholic Church by country
 Catholic Church hierarchy
 List of the Catholic dioceses of the United States

Sources
History article from the Diocese's website
Catholic Schools of the Monterey Diocese 
Catholic-Hierarchy.Org datasheet

References

External links
Roman Catholic Diocese of Monterey Official Site
Cathedral of San Carlos Borromeo website

 
Monterey County, California
San Benito County, California
San Luis Obispo County, California
Santa Cruz County, California
The Californias
Monterey in California
Monterey in California
Monterey in California
1840 establishments in Mexico
Monterey